The 2012 Turkish Cup Final was the 50th final of the Turkish Cup. The final was contested between Bursaspor and Fenerbahçe. Match was played on 16 May 2012, at 20:30 local time. The venue chosen for the match was Ankara 19 Mayıs Stadium, a neutral ground for both clubs. Fenerbahçe were the winners of the match, and eventual winners of the 2011–12 Turkish Cup.

Path to the final
Bursaspor entered the tournament in the third round. They played their first match at their home ground against Şanlıurfaspor, a TFF Second League club. In the fourth round, they faced another TFF Second League club in an away game, and won after extra time. In the quarter-finals stage, they faced a Süper Lig club, Sivasspor in a neutral venue in Istanbul for both sides. Bursaspor played their fourth match in the tournament against Eskişehirspor, this time in Izmir, another neutral venue. A 3–0 semi-final win against their rivals paved the way for the final against Fenerbahçe.

Other finalists Fenerbahçe entered the tournament in the third round too. Their first match was against Konya Torku Şekerspor, a TFF Second League club, on Fenerbahçe's home ground. Their fourth round match was against TFF First League side Samsunspor. In the finals stage, Fenerbahçe played all of their matches (including the final) in Ankara 19 Mayıs Stadium, a neutral venue for the club. Quarter-final match was against Kayserispor, a game won by a dramatic penalty shoot-out. In the semi-finals stage they played against Karabükspor and won by 2–0, paving the way to the final.

Background
This was the 5th final for Bursaspor, who only won the cup in 1986. On the other hand, Fenerbahçe had won the cup four times before. This match was their 14th finals appearance. Both teams have played against each other in the 1974 final, a two-legged tie won by Fenerbahçe.

Fenerbahçe already secured a berth in 2012–13 UEFA Champions League through league position. Because of this, Bursaspor will play in the second qualifying round of the 2012–13 UEFA Europa League.

Regardless of the European access, Fenerbahçe qualified for the 2012 Turkish Super Cup as cup winners.

Final

See also
2011–12 Turkish Cup
2012 Turkish Super Cup

References

2012
Cup
Turkish Cup Final 2012
Turkish Cup Final 2012